The Holpertal is a valley, just one and a half kilometres long, in the central Palatine Forest of Germany. It lies within the municipality of Ramberg in the county of Südliche Weinstraße in the state of Rhineland-Palatinate. Its V-shaped cross-section was cut by the waters of the Holperbach stream, which has incised deeply into the rock layers of the Lower Bunter. The valley floor climbs from an elevation of about 250 metres to well over 400 metres. Its slopes are covered with mixed forest and sweet chestnut. Whilst at one time, the valley produced raw materials for the traditional broom and brush-making industries, today forestry and tourism predominate.

In the immediate vicinity of the Holpertal are a number of points of interest that include the castle ruins of Meistersel, Ramburg and Neuscharfeneck Castle, the Brushmakers' Museum in Ramberg and a number of hiking destinations.

Geography

Location 
The Holpertal lies in the eastern part of the Palatine Forest a few kilometres from the edge of the Haardt and, together with the Nonnental, forms the northern head of the Ramberg valley.

References

Literature 
 
 
 
 

Valleys of Rhineland-Palatinate